Stephen Michael "Steve" Halaiko (December 27, 1908, in Auburn, New York – February 6, 2001) was an American boxer who competed in the 1928 Summer Olympics.

Amateur career
Because of his baseball skill, Halaiko won a scholarship to Cook Academy at Montour Falls, the oldest prep school in New York State. He organized
Cook's first boxing team, serving as coach and captain. Steve made rapid strides with his fists. He won the 1928 national amateur lightweight title, which qualified him for the Olympic Games in Amsterdam that same year. Halaiko won 115 of 116 amateur fights and was the U.S. AAU Champion at 135 lbs in 1928 and 1929.

At the Amsterdam Olympics in 1928, Halaiko won the silver medal in the lightweight class after losing the final against Carlo Orlandi.

1928 Olympic results 
Below are the results of Stephen Halaiko, an American lightweight boxer who competed in the 1928 Amsterdam Olympics:

 Round of 32: Defeated Tomas Poetsch (Czechoslovakia) on points
 Round of 16: Defeated Witold Majchrzycki (Poland) on points
 Quarterfinal: Defeated Pascual Bonfiglio (Argentina) on points
 Semifinal: Defeated Gunnar Berggren (Sweden) on points
 Final: Lost to Carlo Orlandi (Italy) on points

Professional career
Steve turned pro soon after the Olympics and quickly moved up the ladder with a string of victories. In 1930 he won his first important fight by winning an 8-round decision over former lightweight champion Sammy Mandell. 1933 would be one of his best years in the professional ring. He defeated Cocoa Kid twice, he beat and had a draw with Wesley Ramey and scored a decision over Paris Apice. In 1934 Steve defeated Lou Ambers over 6 rounds in Syracuse and less than 3 weeks later they would battle to a 10-round draw in Providence. During Halaiko’s 13-year career he would break the top 10 rankings many times and fight the greats of his era. Among those greats were, Izzy Janazzo, Pedro Montanez, Tippy Larkin and Tony Canzoneri. His final record was 74-35-11 with 22 KO’s which spanned from 1929 to 1942.

Halaiko died on February 6, 2001, at the age of 92.

References

External links
 

1908 births
2001 deaths
Boxers from New York (state)
Lightweight boxers
Olympic boxers of the United States
Boxers at the 1928 Summer Olympics
Olympic silver medalists for the United States in boxing
Sportspeople from Auburn, New York
American male boxers
Medalists at the 1928 Summer Olympics